San Pedro (Spanish: "St. Peter") is a neighborhood within the City of Los Angeles, California. Formerly a separate city, it consolidated with Los Angeles in 1909. The Port of Los Angeles, a major international seaport, is partially located within San Pedro. The district has grown from being dominated by the fishing industry, to a working-class community within the city of Los Angeles, to a rapidly gentrifying community.

History

Indigenous 

The peninsula, including all of San Pedro, was the homeland of the Tongva for thousands of years, home to the village of Chowigna along and the nearby Suangna. In other areas of the Los Angeles Basin archeological sites date back to at least about 10,000 years old. The Tongva used seafaring plank canoes or te'aats, found all throughout the coastline, to travel to and from the Channel Islands and along the coastline. The boats are still constructed by the Tongva today and retain a cultural significance.

First contact with Europeans occurred in 1542 with Juan Rodríguez Cabrillo, the Spanish explorer who noted the extensive presence of the plank boats of the neighboring Chumash.

Origin of name

San Pedro was named for St. Peter of Alexandria, as his feast day is November 24 on the ecclesiastical calendar of Spain, the day on which Juan Rodríguez Cabrillo discovered the San Pedro Bay in 1542. Santa Catalina Island, named after Catherine of Alexandria, was claimed for the Spanish Empire the next day, on her feast day, November 25. In 1602–1603, Sebastián Vizcaíno (1548–1624) officially surveyed and mapped the California coastline, including San Pedro Bay, for New Spain. The anglicized pronunciation is "san-PEE-dro".

Settlement

European settlement began in 1769 as part of an effort to populate California, although trade restrictions encouraged more smuggling than regular business. Rancho San Pedro was the first land grant in the Alta California portion of the Province of Las Californias in New Spain.

When New Spain won its independence from the Spanish Empire and Alta California became part of Mexico, the trade restrictions were lifted, and the town flourished.

Under United States control after 1848, when the United States defeated Mexico in the Mexican–American War, the harbor was greatly improved and expanded under the guidance of Phineas Banning and John Gately Downey, the seventh governor of California after the Free Harbor Fight. In 1868 Banning created the Los Angeles & San Pedro Railroad, Southern California's first railroad and used it to transport goods from San Pedro Bay to Los Angeles, which soon became a major city in Southern California.

San Pedro was a township in the 1860 census.  The township consisted of the present-day South Bay communities, Compton and western Long Beach.  Census records report a population of 359 in 1860.  The township was renamed Wilmington Township for 1870.

In 1906, the city of Los Angeles annexed the Harbor Gateway, a long, narrow strip of land connecting the city to the northern border of Wilmington, and in 1909, the larger city consolidated with Wilmington and with San Pedro.

In 1929, the city experienced the Sunken City Disaster, where an earthquake caused multiple homes to slide off a cliff into the sea.

United States Navy Battle Fleet home port 1919–1940
In 1888, the War Department took control of a tract of land next to the bay and added to it in 1897 and 1910.  This became Fort MacArthur in 1914 and was a coastal defense site for many years. Woodrow Wilson transferred 200 United States Navy ships from the Atlantic to the Pacific in 1919 when tension arose between the United States and Japan over the fate of China. San Diego Bay was considered too shallow for the largest ships, so the battleships anchored in San Pedro Bay on August 9, 1919. Local availability of fuel oil minimized transportation costs, and consistently good weather allowed frequent gunnery exercises off the nearby Channel Islands of California. The heavy cruisers of the Scouting Force were transferred from the Atlantic to San Pedro in response to the 1931 Japanese invasion of Manchuria. By 1934, 14 battleships, two aircraft carriers, 14 cruisers, and 16 support ships were based at San Pedro. On April 1, 1940, the Pacific Fleet battleships sailed to Hawaii for annual fleet exercises. The battleships remained in the Hawaiian Islands to deter Japanese aggression until the attack on Pearl Harbor. The fleet post office, supply depot, fuel depot, degaussing range, ECM repair facility, and naval training schools for small craft, fire fighters, merchant ship communications, and anti-submarine attack remained at San Pedro through World War II; but the battle fleet never returned.

San Pedro was selected as the final home port of the battleship . The Iowa now serves as a museum ship and memorial recognizing "the positive contributions of this battleship and its crew at critical moments in American history".

Fort MacArthur now a sub base of Los Angeles Air Force Base currently serves as privatized housing and administrative annex under the management of Tierra Vista Communities.

Geography and climate

The neighborhood fronts on the Pacific Ocean to the south and is bounded inland by Harbor City and Torrance on the north, Wilmington and Long Beach on the east and Rancho Palos Verdes and Lomita on the west.

Port of Los Angeles

San Pedro, Wilmington, and Terminal Island are the locations of the Port of Los Angeles.

Locations of interest
One San Pedro landmark is the Vincent Thomas Bridge, a -long suspension bridge linking San Pedro with Terminal Island and named after California Assemblyman Vincent Thomas. (It is the fourth longest suspension bridge in California.) Nearby is the Battleship Iowa museum and attraction, the Los Angeles Maritime Museum (the largest maritime museum in California), and the museum ship SS Lane Victory (a fully operational victory ship of World War II and National Historic Landmark). Ports O' Call Village, a tourist destination, which provided shopping venues, waterfront eateries, was demolished in 2019 to make way for West Harbor, a major waterfront food hall and park under development, slated to open in 2024. A historic naval warehouse built in 1944 houses Crafted at the Port of Los Angeles, a permanent craft marketplace.

The Frank Gehry–designed Cabrillo Marine Aquarium had its origins in the old Cabrillo Beach Marine Museum which was located in the historic Bath House at Cabrillo Beach. The Point Fermin Light, a Victorian-era structure built in the late 19th century, is a museum and park on a bluff overlooking the ocean. The Korean Bell of Friendship is a massive bronze memorial bell donated by South Korea in 1976 to the people of Los Angeles. The church of Mary Star of the Sea is a prominent landmark with a steeple-top statue overlooking the harbor.

On July 19, 2003, the San Pedro Waterfront Red Car Line was opened, along the waterfront between downtown San Pedro and the Cruise Ship Terminal. The  line operates along former Pacific Electric right-of-way. The line, rebuilt and maintained by the Port of Los Angeles, also has one original restored Pacific Electric interurban, which is used only for special charter excursions and special events. The original car is Pacific Electric 963 (former Los Angeles Pacific 713 as built in 1907) rebuilt by Richard Fellows and renumbered 1058. Discussions have been held to extend the line to the Cabrillo Marine Aquarium.

On 28th Street, between Gaffey Street and Peck Avenue, is a steep section of public roadway.

Demographics

Population history

Ethnically diverse San Pedro was a magnet for European immigrants from various countries for years, reflected in the number of restaurants representing diverse cuisines, especially Croatian, Portuguese, Mexican, Italian, Irish and Greek. San Pedro is home to the largest Italian-American community in Southern California, centered on the "Via Italia" (South Cabrillo Avenue).San Pedro is also considered the heart of the Croatian and Norwegian communities in Los Angeles. The Croatian community, originally composed of seafarers and fishermen from the Dalmatia (especially the islands of Brač, Hvar, Vis and Korčula) region, has been present in San Pedro since the settlement began more than 200 years ago. The City of Los Angeles even named a stretch of 9th Street "Croatian Place" in honor of the city's old Croatian community. The Norwegian presence can be felt at the Norwegian Seamen's Church.

Until February 1942, San Pedro was home to a vibrant Japanese immigrant community of about 3,000 people who lived in what had been described as a "typical Japanese Fishing Village" on Terminal Island (East San Pedro). These Japanese immigrants pioneered albacore fishing out of San Pedro Bay and harvesting abalone off White Point, thus leading the way in establishing a viable fishing industry in San Pedro. The 48-hour forced expulsion of these San Pedro residents and the razing of their homes and shops, as part of the Japanese-American internment during World War II, is described in Jeanne Wakatsuki Houston's memoir Farewell to Manzanar.

2000 census

A total of 80,065 people lived in San Pedro's 12.06 square miles, according to the 2000 U.S. census—averaging 6,640 people per square mile, near Los Angeles' total population density. The median age was 34 in the San Pedro neighborhood, considered average for Los Angeles.

San Pedro is considered highly diverse ethnically, with a diversity index of 63.0. In 2000, whites made up 44.2% of the population, Latinos were at 40.8%, blacks at 6.1%, Asians at 4.8% and others at 4.1%. Mexico and Italy were the most common places of birth for the 24.5% of the residents who were born abroad, considered a low percentage of foreign-born when compared with the city as a whole.

The $57,508 median household income in 2008 dollars was average for the city and county. Renters occupied 56.1% of the housing units, and homeowners occupied the rest. In 2000 there were 3,394 families headed by single parents, or 17.5%, a rate that was average for the county and the city.
In the same year there were 6,559 military veterans, or 11% of the population, considered high when compared to the city and county as a whole.

Government and infrastructure

City Council

San Pedro anchors the southern end of Los Angeles City Council District 15, which has long been represented only by residents of San Pedro. The neighborhood, according to the Los Angeles Times, "despite accounting for less than one-third of the district's population has enjoyed outsize influence as the district's traditional base of political power."

Federal government

The United States Postal Service operates the San Pedro Post Office at 839 South Beacon Street and the Eastview Post Office at 28649 South Western Avenue. The USPS also operates the Seafarers Post Office at Suite A at 93 Berth in close proximity to the San Pedro Post Office.

The Federal Bureau of Prisons operates the Federal Correctional Institution, Terminal Island on Terminal Island and in San Pedro.

Education

Just 23.8% of San Pedro residents aged 25 or older had completed a four-year degree in 2000, about average when compared with the city and the county at large, and the percentage of those residents with more than a high school diploma was high for the county.

Primary and secondary schools
San Pedro is served by the Los Angeles Unified School District. The area is within Board District 7. As of 2012, Dr. Richard Vladovic represents the district.

San Pedro High School, Mary Star of the Sea High School, and the Port of Los Angeles High School are the primary high schools within the region. San Pedro High School is home to the protected landmarks in the form of The English Language Arts and Administration Buildings (c. 1939, 1936, resp.). The school celebrated its 100-year anniversary in 2003. It is home to both the Marine Science and Police Academy Magnet programs. Port of Los Angeles High School is a public charter high school, fusing a college preparatory program with elective coursework in International Business and Maritime Studies. Such studies reinforce the significant impact of California's ports on the global economy and international trade.

As of 2012, test scores tended to be higher in the area's elementary schools than in its middle and high schools.

Under certain specific circumstances, residents of San Pedro may be admitted into schools in the Palos Verdes Peninsula Unified School District located in the neighboring Palos Verdes Peninsula; specifically they may attend Miraleste Intermediate School and Palos Verdes High School. This admittance is only granted if a student's parent or guardian is enlisted in the US military, has a parent or guardian employed within the Palos Verdes Peninsula, has a grandparent residing within the Palos Verdes Peninsula, or if the student simply lives in a closer vicinity to a PVPUSD school than any other LAUSD schools.

Primary schools (Grades 1–5)
 15th Street Elementary
 Bandini Elementary
 Barton Hill Elementary
 Cabrillo Early Education Center
 Cabrillo Elementary
 Leland Elementary
 Park Western Harbor Magnet
 Point Fermin Marine Science Magnet
 San Pedro/Wilmington Early Education Center
 South Shores Magnet for the Visual and Performing Arts Elementary School
 Taper Elementary
 Taper Avenue Elementary Technology Magnet Center
 White Point Elementary
 Crestwood Elementary
 7th Street Elementary

Secondary schools (Grades 6–12)
 Dana Middle School
 Dodson Middle School (though actually located in Rancho Palos Verdes it is part of LAUSD)
 San Pedro High School 
 San Pedro High School Marine Science Magnet
 San Pedro High School Police Academy
 Port of Los Angeles High School
 Baxter High School (Alliance Alice M. Baxter College-Ready High School)

Continuation schools
 Angel's Gate Continuation High
 Cooper Community Day School
 Harbor Community Adult School
 Harbor Occupational Center

Private schools
Private schools in San Pedro include:
Grades Preschool–8
 Holy Trinity School—Roman Catholic Archdiocese of Los Angeles
Grades 1–8
 Mary Star of the Sea Elementary School—Roman Catholic Archdiocese of Los Angeles
Grades Preschool–8
 Christ Lutheran Church and School 
Grades 6–12
 Rolling Hills Estates Preparatory School—the current location opened on February 6, 2007.

Grades 9–12
 Mary Star of the Sea High School—Roman Catholic Archdiocese of Los Angeles

Libraries
Los Angeles Public Library operates the San Pedro Regional Branch Library at 931 South Gaffey. This library was opened in 1983 in the presence of the late Los Angeles Mayor Tom Bradley.

Media
San Pedro News-Pilot, a newspaper, closed in 1998.

Events
 Annual "Shakespeare by the Sea, Los Angeles" Festival, held at Point Fermin Park each summer.

Honor

San Pedro was declared 2017 Neighborhood of the year by Curbed Los Angeles.

Notable people

See also

 List of districts and neighborhoods in Los Angeles
 List of Los Angeles Historic-Cultural Monuments in the Harbor area
 Palos Verdes Peninsula Land Conservancy
 Streetcars in San Pedro

References

External links

 Port of Los Angeles
 Comments about living in San Pedro from the Los Angeles Times
 San Pedro crime map and statistics from the Los Angeles Times

 
Former municipalities in California
Italian-American culture in Los Angeles
Little Italys in the United States
Los Angeles Harbor Region
Neighborhoods in Los Angeles
Populated coastal places in California
Populated places established in 1769
South Bay, Los Angeles